Brunswick Heads is a small town on the north coast of New South Wales, Australia in Byron Shire.

History 
Originally inhabited by people of the Bundjalung nation, the Brunswick River was charted by Captain Rous in 1828. His visit was followed more than 20 years later by cedar cutters whose activities led to the first town in what is now Byron Shire. By the 1880s Brunswick Heads was a busy port with a small commercial centre.

The township went into decline after the construction of the railway through Mullumbimby in 1894. From the 1920s, however, Brunswick's popularity for family seaside holidays returned. Holiday cottages from that period are still in evidence throughout the town. The early camping grounds along the foreshores later became caravan parks.

Poet and painter Edwin Wilson (b. 1942) started school at Brunswick Heads, as recorded in "The Mullumbimby Kid".

Geography
Brunswick Heads is a small coastal holiday village situated at the mouth of the Brunswick River. Torakina Beach is located within the breakwater, while a white sandy surf beach stretches to the south. The north bank of the river is the home to a protected rainforest and the southern bank provides a harbour and small marina for fishing boats and small craft. Mount Chincogan and Mount Warning are located in the area, and form a backdrop to the river that leads down from the small town of Mullumbimby.

Despite the surrounding coastal development, Brunswick Heads has retained its traditional seaside village atmosphere. Timber bridges link the riverside to the river and surf beaches.

Brunswick Heads is situated 10 km (15 minutes drive) north of the town of Byron Bay and 30 minutes travelling time from both Coolangatta and Ballina airports, and 40 kilometres south of the Queensland border. Brunswick Heads is across the river from Ocean Shores.  The Pacific Highway bypassed Brunswick Heads in 1998.

Economy
Brunswick Heads has a number of cafes, restaurants, accommodation and specialty shops. Brunswick Heads offers a range of leisure activities all year round, and hosts a number of small-scale community and family-oriented festivals and events.

In popular culture
The town was the location for the cult 1980s comedy series Brunswick Heads Revisited (a send-up of Waugh's Brideshead Revisited), broadcast across Australia by the ABC. The fourth series of the ABC TV drama series, SeaChange, was filmed there in 2019.

References

External links
 Brunswickheads.org.au - Website of Brunswick Heads Chamber of Commerce
Visitnsw.com – Brunswick Heads

Towns in New South Wales
Northern Rivers
Fishing communities in Australia
Coastal towns in New South Wales